The Men's individual pursuit (CP 4) at the 2008 Summer Paralympics took place on 7 August at the Laoshan Velodrome.

Records

Preliminaries 
Masashi Ishi (Japan) rode the quickest time in the preliminary round, beating Christopher Scott (Australia) by just 0.643 seconds. They went head to head in the final for gold and silver whilst Cesar Neira (Spain) was third, just 0.047 seconds quicker than fourth placed Jiri Bouska (Czech Republic).

Q = Qualifier
PR = Paralympic Record
WR = World Record

Finals 
The final rounds saw equally close margins, but this time the placing were reversed with Scott taking gold from Ishi with a margin of just 0.013 seconds, and Neira taking the bronze.

Gold medal match

Bronze medal match

References 

Men's individual pursuit (CP 4)